Strahlaxiidae is a family of crustaceans belonging to the infraorder Axiidea, within the order Decapoda.

It contains the following genera:
 Neaxiopsis K.Sakai & de Saint Laurent, 1989
 Neaxius Borradaile, 1903
 Strahlaxius K.Sakai & de Saint Laurent, 1989

References

Decapods